Merrill Edge is an electronic trading platform and investment advisory service that provides self-directed and guided investment options for individuals and businesses. It is a subsidiary of Bank of America and was launched in 2010 after the merger between Merrill Lynch and Bank of America. Merrill Edge offers a wide range of investment products, including stocks, bonds, exchange-traded funds (ETFs), margin lending, mutual funds, and options. 

As of 2022, Merrill Edge held $320 billion in assets from 3.5 million clients, and employed 4,000 advisors working in bank branches and call centers. The firm focuses on the mass affluent market. Merrill Edge receives revenue from interest income on cash and margin balances, commissions for order execution, management services, and it does not engage in payment for order flow.

History
Launched on June 21, 2010, Merrill Edge is a "a no-frills brokerage unit" of parent company Bank of America's retail banking division. Created after Merrill Lynch became a subsidiary of Bank of America in 2008, it contains the Merrill Lynch name and its employees are included in Merrill Lynch's number of employees. It merged Bank of America's online investing platform (Quick & Reilly) and Merrill Lynch's research, investment tools, and call center counsel. At its inception, Merrill Edge had 500,000 customers from Bank of America's current clients. 

Bank of America launched the product to compete with Charles Schwab Corporation and Fidelity Investments for the numerous fledgling investors unprepared for comprehensive advice. Bank of America aimed to build brand loyalty among these younger investors who generally have strong technical skills and appreciate a higher degree of openness and personal oversight of their accounts. 

In 2015, the five-year-old Merrill Edge had $118 billion in 2 million customers' investable assets. It accumulated the assets through three main avenues: existing Bank of America customers (which accounted for around a third of the assets held), Merrill Lynch referrals (which accounted for a marginally higher proportion of the assets), and marketing (which accounted for the rest). Bank of America added videoconferencing kiosks to their bank branches in the Los Angeles metropolitan area and the Washington metropolitan area to promote Merrill Edge and to allow customers to receive counsel from employees based in Arizona, Florida, and New Jersey. Bank of America marketed Merrill Edge on their locations' windows and automated teller machines.

In 2012, Merrill Edge released Face Retirement, a product that age progresses a submitted photo of a person. The aim of the tool is to convince people to save for retirement earlier because a study has shown that younger people who think of themselves being older save more. 

In 2015, Merrill Edge had 2,500 advisors working in bank branches and call centers. Roughly 1,500 of the advisors worked in the bank branches. The Wall Street Journal reported in 2015 that Bank of America intends to increase by twofold Merrill Edge's banking branch employee number. According to Reuters, the service's "financial solution advisors" are "licensed broker-dealers and bankers who are paid a salary", whereas full-service brokers receive commissions. Aron Levine, the head of Preferred Banking and Merrill Edge, manages the bank branch advisors. 

In a 2015 interview with The Wall Street Journal, Aron Levine said the company was considering an "automated advice service". Dozens of Bank of America workers worked on a prototype of the product, which was planned for release in 2016. Merrill Edge began offering to customers robo-advisors that employ algorithms in February of 2017. At the end of 2017, assets of the largely self-directed and robo-advised customers at Merrill Edge totaled $177 billion.

In May 2018, Merrill Lynch along with Merrill Edge launched ESG model portfolios.

As of September 2019, Merrill Edge had $223 billion in client assets.

Merrill Edge joined brokerage wars in October of 2019 with unlimited free trades for roughly 6 million retail customers in Bank of America's Preferred Rewards loyalty program. Two months later, in December, it was extended to all self-directed accounts. Its predecessor had pioneered zero-dollar trades in 2006, for select investors.

Products
Merrill Edge offers its services through an online platform, which includes a website and mobile app. The platform provides clients with access to educational resources, research tools, and market insights to help them make informed investment decisions. Clients can also access a range of self-directed and guided investment portfolios.

The platform also provides clients with access to financial advisors who can help them navigate the investment landscape and provide personalized investment guidance through investment advisory programs. Merrill Edge offers both phone and in-person consultations for clients enrolled in their Merrill Guided Investing with an Advisor program. Clients can also use the platform's robo-advisory service, Merrill Edge Guided Investing Online, which provides automated investment management services.

Merrill Edge's services are available to individual investors, as well as small business owners and corporate clients. The platform provides a range of account types, including individual and joint brokerage accounts, retirement accounts such as IRA, Roth IRA, custodial accounts for minors, as well as 529 plans for education savings.

For experienced investors Merrill Edge provides access to MarketPro, an advanced trading platform that provides advanced charting and analysis tools, as well as customizable trading layouts. In addition, Merrill Edge MarketPro offers real-time streaming data from major exchanges around the world, including NYSE, and NASDAQ. The platform is available to all Merrill Edge clients at no additional cost and can be accessed via desktop, web, or mobile devices.

While Merrill Edge offers a range of investment options for its clients, there are some limitations to its offerings. For instance, the online brokerage does not provide access to more alternative assets, such as cryptocurrency, foreign exchange (forex) or futures trading. Additionally, it does not offer access to international markets or penny stocks. Furthermore, fractional share trading is not available, meaning you can only purchase a full share of a stock.

Merrill Edge offers a cash management account to hold un-invested cash. This account earns interest and offers convenient access to cash through debit cards and checks. Additionally, the automatic sweeps feature ensures that idle cash in investment accounts is automatically moved to the cash management account to earn interest.

The Difference between Merrill Edge and Merrill 
Merrill, previously branded Merrill Lynch, and Merrill Edge are distinct entities, but they are affiliated and fall under the Bank of America umbrella. Merrill is a traditional, full-service wealth management firm that caters to high net worth and emerging affluent investors. Its financial advisors are incentivized to build and maintain long-term relationships with wealthy clients. In contrast, Merrill Edge is an discount online brokerage platform that doesn't require an account minimum and offers commission-free trades for stocks and ETFs, while still granting access to the research and tools available to Merrill customers.

Referrals
Merrill Lynch brokers were told to refer customers with less than $250,000 in investments to Merrill Edge. The intent was for the brokers to focus on wealthier investors and for Merrill Edge to reciprocate by sending customers with more than $250,000 in investments to Merrill Lynch. In 2015, the Merrill Lynch Broker-dealer incentive system changed to give brokers no money for managing accounts less than $250,000. In 2014, Merrill Edge referred 30,000 customers to Merrill Lynch and U.S. Trust. Converted referrals gave Merrill Lynch an additional $4 billion to manage, which when apportioned among Merrill Lynch's 14,000 advisors is roughly $285,700 and two referrals per adviser. When referred to Merrill Lynch, Merrill Edge's customers sometimes do not migrate their accounts because of the higher costs for trades.

Comparison to other electronic brokerage platforms 
Merrill Edge has some advantages and disadvantages compared with other online brokers. Some of the advantages are:

 It offers $0 trades for stocks and ETFs.
 It provides access to high-quality research from Bank of America Merrill Lynch, Morningstar and CFRA.
 It has reliable customer service and support at Bank of America locations.
 Merrill Edge offers full integration with Bank of America, allowing clients to manage their banking and brokerage needs under one roof.

Some of the disadvantages are.

 It charges high fees for some services, such as broker-assisted trades ($29.95), mutual fund transactions ($19.95) and margin rates (up to 8.625%).

 It does not support cryptocurrency trading or futures trading.

See also 
Broker-dealer

Ultra-High-Net-Worth individual

High-Frequency Trading

References

External links
 

Bank of America
Merrill (company)
American companies established in 2010
Financial services companies established in 2010
Online brokerages